Mark Jendrysik (born October 2, 1964) is a professor in the Political Science and Public Administration Department of the University of North Dakota.

He is primarily interested in contemporary American political thought, but he has also published and presented papers on the seventeenth-century English political thought, utopian political theory, and ethnic politics in the United States.  He is the author of Explaining the English Revolution: Hobbes and His Contemporaries (Lexington, 2002) and Modern Jeremiahs: Contemporary Visions of American Decline (Rowman and Littlefield, 2008)

Biography 
Jendrysik is of Polish ancestry. He   is a native of Chicopee, Massachusetts. He attended Valetine School, in Chicopee Massachusetts 1969-1976, and then the P.E. Bowe School in  Chicopee 1976-1978 and Chicopee High School 1978-82. He received a BA from Providence College, Providence RI in 1986, a MA  from University of North Carolina at Chapel Hill in 1988, and a PhD from the same university in 1996

From 1995-6 he was a Research Associate, Center for Survey Research, University of Virginia, and then in 1996–8 a Visiting Assistant Professor, Bucknell University, follow by an appointment at the same level from 1998–9, at the  University of Mississippi, 1998-9. In 1999 he was appointed Assistant Professor at the  University of North Dakota rising through the ranks to Associate and then full Professor.

Books
Modern Jeremiahs: Contemporary Visions of American Decline. Lanham, Maryland: Rowman and Littlefield, Lexington Books, 2008
Explaining the English Revolution: Hobbes and His Contemporaries. Lanham, Maryland: Lexington Books, 2002 (revised paperback edition, 2007). Reviewed in: Journal of Church and State, Vol. 47. No. 1 (170). 2005; Perspectives on Politics, Vol. 1, No. 4 (763), 2003
Utopia (Key Concepts in Political Theory). Cambridge, UK: Polity, 2020.

References

External links
University of North Dakota-Home Page
Political Science Public Administration-Faculty & Staff
 

1964 births
Living people
American political philosophers
Providence College alumni
University of North Carolina at Chapel Hill alumni
University of North Dakota faculty
American people of Polish descent